Solignano is a comune (municipality) in the Province of Parma in the Italian region Emilia-Romagna, located about  west of Bologna and about  southwest of Parma.

Twin towns
 Grambois, France

References

Cities and towns in Emilia-Romagna